Bloody Monday is a name used to describe a series of arrests and attacks that took place during a civil rights protest held on June 10, 1963, in Danville, Virginia. It was held to protest segregation laws and racial inequality and was one of several protests held during the month of June. It attracted veteran protesters from out of town, such as Ivanhoe Donaldson, Avon Rollins, Robert Zellner and Dorthy Miller (Zellner) of the Student Nonviolent Coordinating Committee. The events received widespread criticism from national media, especially for the subsequent trials overseen by Judge Archibald M. Aiken.

During the day thirty-eight protesters were arrested and jailed for their participation in the protests. In response fifty protesters gathered at the city jail to hold a prayer vigil that evening. Participants at the vigil were attacked by the town's police and deputized citizens using billy clubs and water hoses. Sixty-five people were taken to the town's African-American hospital as a result of the events of that day. Forty-seven of the victims were people attending the prayer vigil. Martin Luther King Jr. visited Danville to support the demonstrators on July 11, 1963, but chose not to hold a march. 

Judge Aiken began trying the arrested protesters on June 17. His handling of the cases of those arrested has received criticism from several people and organizations such as the United States Department of Justice. During the trials Aiken refused to give out bills of particulars or grant continuances or bail. He also announced guilty verdicts from a pre-typed script and made it nearly, if not completely, impossible for the defendants to appeal their sentences.

See also
 Bloody Tuesday (1964)

References

External links 
"WDBJ7 (CBS affiliate) documentary on Bloody Monday"

Danville, Virginia
Civil rights movement
1963 in Virginia
1963 protests
Riots and civil disorder in Virginia
June 1963 events in the United States
African-American history of Virginia
History of racism in Virginia
Police brutality in the United States